Hydalsberget is a mountain in the municipality of Hemsedal in Buskerud, Norway.

External links
Hydalsberget (peakbook.org)

Hemsedal
Mountains of Viken